Pick Me Up may refer to:
 Hair of the dog (that bit you), hangover remedy
"Pick Me Up" (Masters of Horror), the eleventh episode of the first season of Masters of Horror
Pick Me Up! (magazine) , a British women's magazine
Pick Me Up (album), an album by Brett Kissel
Pick Me Up (book), a book by Dorling Kindersley published in 2006
"Pick Me Up", a song by Emilia de Poret
"Pick Me Up", a song by Perfume
"Pick Me Up",  a song from Brett Kissel  from Pick Me Up